The women's team épée competition at the 2018 Asian Games in Jakarta was held on 24 August at the Jakarta Convention Center. China team emerged as the champion in this event after beat South Korea with the score 29–28 in the final. This edition, made the China team has collected five gold medals throughout the women's team épée event at the Asian Games. The silver medal captured by South Korean team, and the bronze medals goes to Hong Kong and Japan team.

Schedule
All times are Western Indonesia Time (UTC+07:00)

Seeding
The teams were seeded taking into account the results achieved by competitors representing each team in the individual event.

Results

Final standing

References

Results

External links
 Fencing at the 2018 Asian Games - Women's team épée

Women's épée team